Jon Anthony Hill (born September 19, 1963) is a United States Navy Vice Admiral who serves as the Director of the Missile Defense Agency. Previously, he was the Deputy Director of the same agency. 
His first Flag Officer assignment was as U.S. Navy Program Executive Officer for Integrated Warfare Systems (PEO IWS) where he was accountable for surface ship sensors, command and control, and weapons. He has served in multiple combat system and shipbuilding program offices, Naval Surface Warfare Centers, along with tours with the U.S. Army, Joint Staff and the SECNAV Staff. He qualified in Surface Warfare as an ensign aboard USS RICHARD E. BYRD (DDG-23). Born and raised at Fort Bliss, Texas, Hill received a bachelor's degree in biology and chemistry from St. Mary's University and later earned an M.S. degree in applied physics and ordnance engineering from the Naval Postgraduate School.

Personal 
Hill is the son of Albert Bevins Hill (March 1, 1930 – October 2, 2011) and Bessie (Luke) Hill (January 19, 1926 – February 19, 1999). He has two sisters and one brother.

Hill is married to Cynthia Hill, and they have three daughters.

Awards and decorations

References

External links

1963 births
Living people
People from El Paso County, Texas
St. Mary's University, Texas alumni
Naval Postgraduate School alumni
United States Navy admirals
Military personnel from Texas